In Japanese popular culture,  is a genre of fictional media in which young (or young-looking) girl characters appear in romantic or sexual contexts. The term, a portmanteau of the English words "Lolita" and "complex", also refers to desire and affection for such characters ("loli"), and fans of such characters and works. Associated with unrealistic and stylized imagery within manga, anime, and video games, lolicon in otaku (manga/anime fan) culture is understood as distinct from desires for realistic depictions of girls, or real girls as such, and is associated with the concept of moe, or feelings of affection and love for fictional characters as such (often cute characters in manga and anime).

The phrase "Lolita complex", derived from the novel Lolita, entered use in Japan in the 1970s, when sexual imagery of the shōjo (idealized young girl) was expanding in the country's media. During the "lolicon boom" in adult manga of the early 1980s, the term was adopted in the nascent otaku culture to denote attraction to early bishōjo (cute girl) characters, and later to only younger-looking depictions as bishōjo designs became more varied. The artwork of the boom, strongly influenced by the round styles of shōjo manga (marketed to girls), marked a shift from previous realism and the advent of "cute eroticism" (kawaii ero), an aesthetic now common in manga and anime more broadly. The lolicon boom faded by the mid-1980s, and the genre has since made up a minority of erotic manga.

A moral panic against "harmful manga" in the 1990s has made lolicon a keyword in manga debates in Japan. Child pornography laws in some countries include depictions of fictional child characters, while those in other countries, including Japan, do not. Opponents and supporters have debated if the genre contributes to child sexual abuse. Cultural critics generally identify lolicon with a broader separation between fiction and reality in otaku sexuality.

Definition and scope
Lolicon is a Japanese portmanteau of "Lolita complex" (rorīta konpurekkusu), an English-language phrase derived from Vladimir Nabokov's novel Lolita (1955) but in Japan more associated with Russell Trainer's The Lolita Complex (1966, translated 1969), a work of pop psychology in which the author uses the term to describe adult male attraction to pubescent and pre-pubescent females. In Japanese, the phrase was adopted to describe feelings of love and lust for young girls over adult women, which remains the phrase's common meaning. Due to its association with otaku (manga and anime fan) culture, however, the term today is more often used to describe desires for young or young-looking girl characters ("loli") which are generally understood to exist and be satisfied in fiction, though the meaning of the term remains contested and for the public at large still carries a connotation of pedophilia. Lolicon also refers to sexualized works which feature such characters, and fans of these works and characters. It is distinct from more formal words for pedophilia (yōji-zuki or pedofiria; clinically, shōniseiai or jidōseiai) and child pornography (jidō poruno).

The meaning of lolicon in the otaku context developed in the early 1980s, during the "lolicon boom" in adult manga (see ). According to editor and critic Akira Akagi, the term's meaning moved away from the sexual pairing of an older man and a young girl, and instead came to describe desire for "cuteness" and "girl-ness" in manga and anime. Other critics defined lolicon as the desire for "cute things", "manga-like" or "anime-like" characters, "roundness", and the "two-dimensional", as opposed to "real". At the time, all eroticism in the manga style featuring cute girl (bishōjo) characters was associated with the term, and synonyms of "Lolita complex" included "two-dimensional complex" (nijigen konpurekkusu), "two-dimensional fetishism" (nijikon fechi), "two-dimensional syndrome" (nijikon shōkōgun), "cute girl syndrome" (bishōjo shōkōgun), and simply "sickness" (byōki). As character body types in erotic manga became more varied by the end of the lolicon boom, the scope of the term narrowed to more young-looking depictions.

Lolicon became a keyword in debates after the 1989 arrest of Tsutomu Miyazaki, a serial killer of young girls who was portrayed in media reports as an otaku (see ). As lolicon was conflated with desire for real children in debates on "harmful manga", the early meaning was replaced among otaku by moe, which refers to feelings of affection and love for characters more generally. Like moe, lolicon is still used by otaku to refer to attraction that is consciously distinct from reality; some otaku identify as "two-dimensional lolicon" (nijigen rorikon) to clarify their attraction to characters. The term has become a keyword in criticism of manga and sexuality within Japan, as well as globally with the spread of Japanese popular culture.

History

Background
In the 1970s, shōjo manga (marketed to girls) underwent a renaissance in which artists experimented with new narratives and styles, and introduced themes such as psychology, gender, and sexuality. These developments attracted adult male fans of shōjo manga, who crossed gendered boundaries to produce and consume it. The first appearance of the term "Lolita complex" in manga was in Stumbling Upon a Cabbage Patch, an Alice in Wonderland–inspired work by Shinji Wada published in the June 1974 issue of the shōjo manga magazine Bessatsu Margaret, where a male character calls Lewis Carroll a man with a "strange character of liking only small children" in an inside joke to adult readers. Early lolicon artwork was influenced by male artists mimicking shōjo manga, as well as erotic manga created by female artists for male readers.

The image of the shōjo (young girl) became dominant in Japanese mass media by the 1970s as an idealization of cuteness, innocence, and an "idealized Eros", attributes which became attached to imagery of younger girls over time. Nude photographs of shōjo, conceived as fine art, gained popularity: a photo collection entitled  was published in 1969, and in 1972 and 1973 there was an "Alice boom" in nude photos themed around Alice in Wonderland. Specialty adult magazines carrying nude photos, fiction, and essays on the appeal of young girls emerged in the 1980s; this trend faded in the late 1980s, due to backlash and because many men preferred images of shōjo in manga and anime. The spread of such imagery, both in photographs and in manga, may have been helped by prohibitions on displaying pubic hair under Japan's obscenity laws.

1970s–1980s

The rise of lolicon as a genre began at Comiket (Comic Market), a convention for the sale of dōjinshi (self-published works) founded in 1975 by the group  (Labyrinth), made of adult male fans of shōjo manga; in 1979, a group of male artists published the first issue of the fanzine , whose standout work was an erotic parody of Little Red Riding Hood by Hideo Azuma, known as a pioneer of lolicon. Prior to Cybele, the dominant style in seinen (marketed to men) and pornographic manga was gekiga, characterized by realism, sharp angles, dark hatching, and gritty linework. Azuma's work, in contrast, displayed light shading and clean, circular lines, which he saw as "thoroughly erotic" and sharing with shōjo manga a "lack of reality". Azuma's combination of the stout bodies of Osamu Tezuka's manga and the emotive faces of shōjo manga marked the advent of the bishōjo character and the aesthetic of "cute eroticism" (kawaii ero). While erotic, Azuma's manga was also viewed as humorous and parodic; only a minority of readers found his style erotic at first, but a large fan base soon grew in response to the alternative to pornographic gekiga that it represented. Erotic manga mostly moved away from combining realistic bodies and cartoony faces towards a wholly-unrealistic style. Lolicon manga played a role in attracting male fans to Comiket, an event originally dominated by women (90 percent of participants were female at its first run in 1975); in 1981, the number of male and female participants was equal. Lolicon, mostly created by and for men, served as a response to yaoi (manga featuring male homoeroticism), mostly created by and for women.

The early 1980s saw a "lolicon boom" in professional and amateur art. The popularity of lolicon within the otaku community would attract the attention of publishers with the creation of specialty publications dedicated to the genre, including Lemon People (1982) and Manga Burikko (1982). Lemon People in particular was one of the first lolicon manga magazines published in Japan, with the first issue's cover stating that it "had the monopoly on lolicon comic content in 1982", expressing the excitement over the word lolicon itself. The genre's rise was closely linked to the concurrent development of otaku culture and growing fan consciousness; the word otaku itself was coined in Burikko in 1983. Originally founded as an unprofitable gekiga magazine, the publication was transformed into a lolicon magazine in 1983 by editor Eiji Ōtsuka, whose intention was to publish "shōjo manga for boys". Artwork in the magazine continued the trend started by Azuma rooted in the soft styles of shōjo manga, with less realism and fewer explicit depictions of sex; in November 1983, Burikko editors yielded to reader demands by removing photographs of gravure idol models from its opening pages, printing an issue with the subtitle "Totally Bishōjo Comic Magazine". Uchiyama's works were published in both niche magazines such as Lemon People and in the mainstream Shōnen Champion. The first-ever pornographic anime series was Lolita Anime, released episodically in 1984–1985.

Iconic characters of the boom include Clarisse from the film Lupin III: Castle of Cagliostro (1979) and Lana from the TV series Future Boy Conan (1978), both directed by Hayao Miyazaki. Many early lolicon works combined mecha and bishōjo elements; Kaoru Nagayama highlights the premiere of the Daicon III Opening Animation at the 1981 Japan SF Convention as a notable example of the link between science fiction and lolicon in the nascent otaku culture of the time. Anime shows targeted at young girls with young girl heroines, such as Magical Princess Minky Momo (1982–1983), gained new viewership from adult male fans, who started fan clubs and were courted by creators. Helen McCarthy suggests that lolicon anime is rooted in magical girl shows such as Minky Momo, where transforming heroines can blur lines between girls and women.

While the lolicon boom in commercial erotic manga only lasted until 1984, it marked the beginning of its now-dominant bishōjo style. Near the end of the boom, because "readers had no attachment to lolicon per se" and "did not take [young girls] as objects of sexual desire", a majority of readers and creators of erotic manga moved towards the diversifying bishōjo works featuring "baby-faced and big-breasted" characters, which were no longer considered lolicon. At Comiket, lolicon manga had declined in popularity by 1989 with developments in erotic dōjinshi, including new genres of fetishism and the growing popularity of softcore eroticism popular among men and women, particularly in yuri (manga with lesbian themes).

1990s–present

In 1989, lolicon and otaku became the subject of a media frenzy and moral panic after the arrest of Tsutomu Miyazaki, a young man who had kidnapped and murdered four girls between the ages of four and seven and committed sexual acts with their corpses. Widely disseminated photos of Miyazaki's room revealed an extensive collection of video tapes, which included horror/slasher films on which he had modelled some of his crimes, and manga, including shōjo and lolicon works. In the extended public debates that followed, Miyazaki's crimes were blamed on supposed media effects: namely, a reduction in his inhibitions to crime, and a blurring of the lines between fiction and reality. Miyazaki was labelled as an otaku, and an image of otaku as "socially and sexually immature" men, and for some as "pedophiles and potential predators", was established for much of the public. The decade saw local crackdowns on retailers and publishers of "harmful manga", and the arrests of some dōjinshi artists. Despite this, lolicon imagery expanded and became more acceptable within manga in the 1990s, and the early 2000s saw a small boom in the genre sparked by the magazine Comic LO.

Media
Lolicon media is loosely defined. Some define its characters by age, while others define its characters by appearance (those that are small and flat-chested, independent of age). Lolicon works often depict girl characters as innocent, precocious, and sometimes flirtatious; characters may appear in borderline or outright sexual situations, though the term can be applied to works with neither (see ).

According to Kaoru Nagayama, manga readers define lolicon works as those "with a heroine younger than a middleschool student", a definition which can vary from characters under age 18 for "society at large", to characters "younger than gradeschool-aged" for "fanatics", and to "kindergarteners" for "more pedophiliac readers". Elisabeth Klar observes that girl characters in lolicon can show an "contradictory performance of age" in which their body, behavior, and role in a story conflict; an example is the roribabā ("Lolita granny") archetype, a girl character who speaks with the mannerisms of an old woman. Curvy hips and other secondary sex characteristics similarly appear as features in some of the genre's characters. Plot devices often explain the young appearance of characters who are non-human or actually much older.

Lolicon manga, often published as dōjinshi or compiled in anthology magazines, is mostly consumed by male audiences, though Nagayama notes that the works of  have "resonated with female readers" and "earned the support of women". Other notable artists include Aguda Wanyan and Takarada Gorgeous.

Lolicon imagery is a prominent theme in Superflat, a manga-influenced contemporary art movement founded by Takashi Murakami. Prominent Superflat artists whose works feature lolicon imagery include Mr. and Henmaru Machino. Murakami himself did a lolicon-inspired photoshoot with Britney Spears for the cover of the magazine Pop.

Relation to moe
In the 1990s, lolicon imagery evolved and contributed to the mainstream development of moe, the generalized affective response to fictional characters (typically bishōjo characters in manga, anime, and computer games) and its associated design elements. The bishōjo character form moved from niche, otaku publications to mainstream manga magazines, and saw explosive popularity in the decade with the rise of bishōjo games and anime series such as Sailor Moon and Neon Genesis Evangelion, which pioneered media and merchandising based on fan affection for their female protagonists. Moe characters, which tend to be physically immature girl characters exemplified by cuteness, are ubiquitous in contemporary manga and anime. In contrast to lolicon works, sexuality in moe is treated indirectly or not at all; the moe response is often defined with emphasis on platonic love.

John Oppliger of AnimeNation identifies Ro-Kyu-Bu!, Kodomo no Jikan, and Moetan as examples of series which challenge the distinction between moe and lolicon through use of sexual innuendo, commenting that they "satire the chaste sanctity of the moé phenomenon" and "poke fun at viewers and the arbitrary delineations that viewers assert". "Moe-style" lolicon works depict mild eroticism, such as glimpses of underwear, and forgo explicit sex.

Genre features
Akira Akagi identified five themes in lolicon manga in 1993: sadomasochism, "groping objects" (alien tentacles or robots in the role of the penis), "mecha fetishes" (combinations of a machine and a girl), erotic parodies of mainstream anime and manga, and "simply indecent or perverted stuff", also noting common themes of lesbianism and masturbation. Media scholar Setsu Shigematsu argues that these forms of substitution and mimicry enable lolicon to "transform straight sex into a parodic form". More extreme works depict themes including coercion, rape, incest, bondage, and hermaphroditism.

Nagayama argues that most pornographic lolicon manga deal with a "consciousness of sin", or a sense of taboo and guilt in its consumption. Some manga manage this by portraying the girl as enjoying the experience in the end, while others represent the girl as the active partner in sex who seduces men to her. Other lolicon manga, where "men are absolute evil and girls are pitiable victims", indulge in the "pleasure of sin" through the breaking of taboos, which he argues affirms the fragility of the characters. He posits that manga depicting sex between children avoid the "consciousness of sin" via mutual innocence, while also thematizing nostalgia and an idealized past, while other lolicon manga accomplish this through characters with especially unrealistic and moe designs, where "it is precisely because fiction is distinguished from reality as fiction that one can experience moe".

Legality and censorship

Child pornography laws in some countries, including United Kingdom, Canada, and Australia, have expanded since the 1990s to include sexually explicit depictions of fictional child characters, while those in other countries, including Japan and the United States, exclude fiction from relevant definitions.

In 1999, Japan passed a national law criminalizing the production and distribution of child pornography. The law's original draft included depictions of fictional children in its definition of child pornography; after "criticism from many in Japan", this text was removed in the final version. In 2014, Japan's parliament amended the 1999 law to criminalize possession of child pornography; the 2013 draft introduced by the Liberal Democratic Party (LDP), which maintained the existing legal definition, included a provision for a government investigation on whether manga, anime, and computer-generated images "similar to child pornography" were connected to child sexual abuse, which would be followed by a later decision on regulation. This provision was opposed by anime and manga artist and publishing associations, which argued that regulation would infringe on freedom of expression and negatively impact the creative industry and cited a lack of existing evidence linking fiction and crime. The provision was removed from the law's final version, which took effect in 2015.

Lolicon media is a common target of local ordinances in Japan which restrict distribution of materials designated "harmful to the healthy development of youth", which were strengthened throughout the 1990s and 2000s. An amendment proposed in 2010 to the Tokyo law on material banned from sale to minors (described by Vice Governor Naoki Inose as targeting non-pornographic lolicon manga, writing that "We had regulation for eromanga, but not for lolicon") restricted depictions of "non-existent youths" who appeared under age 18 and were portrayed in "anti-social sexual situations". Under massive opposition from manga creators, academics, and fans, the bill was rejected in June 2010 by Tokyo Metropolitan Assembly; however, a revision passed in December 2010 which restricts "manga, anime, and computer games" where any characters engage in "sexual or pseudo sexual acts that would be illegal in real life" depicted in a way that "glorifies or exaggerates" such acts. In 2011, several manga were listed for restriction, including  ("My Wife Is an Elementary Student"), which had been previously criticized on television by Inose. It was later published online by J-Comi, avoiding restriction.

Sexualized depictions of young girl characters have also been subject to censorship and restriction outside of Japan. In 2006, North American publisher Seven Seas Entertainment licensed the manga series Kodomo no Jikan for release under the title Nymphet, but cancelled its plans in 2007 after vendor cancellations. In a statement, the company noted that the manga "cannot be considered appropriate for the US market by any reasonable standard". In 2020, Australian senator Stirling Griff criticized the Australian Classification Board for giving ratings to manga and anime depicting "child exploitation", and called for a review of classification regulations; later in the year, the board banned the import and sale of three volumes of the light novel series No Game No Life for sexualized depiction of young characters. Some online platforms, including Discord and Reddit, ban lolicon content.

Debate 
Explaining the exclusion of lolicon from the 2014 amendment to Japan's child pornography laws, an LDP lawmaker stated that "Manga, anime, and CG child pornography don't directly violate the rights of girls or boys. It has not been scientifically validated that it even indirectly causes damage. Since it hasn't been validated, punishing people who view it would go too far;" his statement echoes activist arguments. Statistically, sexual abuse of minors in Japan has declined since the 1960s and 1970s while the prevalence of fictional lolicon has increased; Patrick W. Galbraith interprets this as evidence that lolicon imagery does not necessarily influence crimes and argues that lolicon characters do not necessarily represent real boys or girls, but rather what McLelland calls a "third gender,"  while Steven Smet suggests that lolicon is an "exorcism of fantasies" that contributes to Japan's low crime rates. Galbraith further argues that otaku culture collectively promotes a media literacy and ethical position of separating fiction and reality, especially when the conflation of the two would be dangerous. Drawing on his fieldwork as an anthropologist, he writes that the sexual imagination of otaku, including lolicon, "did not lead to 'immoral acts', but rather ethical activity". A 2012 report by the Sexologisk Klinik for the Danish government found no evidence that cartoons and drawings depicting fictive child sexual abuse encourage real abuse. Academic Sharalyn Orbaugh argues that manga depicting underage sexuality can help victims of child sexual abuse to work through their own trauma, and that there is greater harm in regulating sexual expression than potential harm caused by such manga.

Legal scholar Hiroshi Nakasatomi argues that lolicon can distort readers' sexual desires and induce crime, and that it violates the rights of children, a view shared by the non-profit organization CASPAR (founded after the Miyazaki case). Some critics, such as the non-profit organization Lighthouse, claim that lolicon works can be used for child grooming, and that they engender a culture that is accepting of sexual abuse. Guidelines released in 2019 by the United Nations Human Rights Committee encouraged state parties to include explicit drawings of fictional children in laws against child pornography, "in particular when such representations are used as part of a process to sexually exploit children". Feminist critic Kuniko Funabashi argues that lolicon manga contributes to sexual violence by portraying girls passively and by "presenting the female body as the man's possession". Legal scholar Shin'ichirō Harata argues that child pornography laws should not collapse reality and fiction together, but also that fans should not dismiss an ambivalence represented by lolicon. He describes the practice of keeping the two separated as the "ethics of moe", or "responsibility of otaku".

Dilton Rocha Ferraz Ribeiro analyzes the debate over the legal status of lolicon works in Japan and finds that both the pro-regulation and anti-regulation coalitions are relatively stable, with each reacting to actions by the other coalition. Catherine Driscoll and Liam Grealy argue that these debates, including international pressure on Japan to regulate these works, create a "discourse of Japanese exceptionalism" to international norms.

Critical commentary 
Cultural critics responding to lolicon generally emphasize it as distinct from attraction to real young girls. Anthropologist Patrick W. Galbraith finds that "from early writings to the present, researchers suggest that lolicon artists are playing with symbols and working with tropes, which does not reflect or contribute to sexual pathology or crime". Psychologist Tamaki Saitō, who has conducted clinical work with otaku, highlights the estrangement of lolicon desires from reality as part of a strict distinction for otaku between "textual and actual sexuality", and observes that "the vast majority of otaku are not pedophiles in actual life". Manga researcher Yukari Fujimoto argues that lolicon desire "is not for a child, but for the image itself", and that this is understood by those "brought up in [Japan's] culture of drawing and fantasy". Cultural historian Mark McLelland identifies lolicon and yaoi as "self-consciously anti-realist" genres, given a rejection by fans and creators of "three-dimensionality" in favor of "two-dimensionality", and compares lolicon to the yaoi fandom, in which largely female and heterosexual fans consume depictions of male homosexuality which "lack any correspondent in the real world". Setsu Shigematsu argues that lolicon reflects a shift in "erotic investment" from reality to "two-dimensional figures of desire". Queer theorist Yuu Matsura argues that two-dimensional characters are non-human "artifacts" and that desire oriented to such characters is not a desire toward humans. Matsuura calls the marginalization of fictosexuals or Nijikon  "interpersonal sexuality centrism" (taijin seiai chūshin shugi) and criticizes that considering two-dimensional lolicon as "child pornography" is interpersonal sexuality centrism.

Most scholars also identify lolicon as a form of self-expression on the part of its male creators and consumers. Sociologist Sharon Kinsella suggests that for lolicon fans, "the infantilized female object of desire [...] has crossed over to become an aspect of their own self image and sexuality". Akira Akagi argues that lolicon manga represented a notable shift in reader identification from the "hero" penetrator common to pornographic gekiga: "Lolicon readers do not need a penis for pleasure, but rather they need the ecstasy of the girl. [...] They identify with the girl, and get caught up in a masochistic pleasure." Manga critic Gō Itō views this as an "abstract desire", quoting lolicon artist who told him that "he was the girl who is raped in his manga", reflecting a feeling of being "raped by society, or by the world". Kaoru Nagayama posits that lolicon readers adopt a fluid perspective that alternates between that of an omniscient voyeur and the multiple characters in a work, reflecting an active reader role and a projection onto girl characters. Writing in The Book of Otaku (1989), feminist Chizuko Ueno argued that lolicon, as an orientation towards fictional bishōjo, is "completely different from pedophilia", and characterized it as a desire to "be part of the 'cute' world of shōjo" for male fans of shōjo manga who "find it too much to be a man".

Several scholars identify the emergence of lolicon with changes in Japanese gender relations. Sociologist Kimio Itō attributes the rise of lolicon manga to a shift in the 1970s and 1980s, when boys, driven by a feeling that girls were "surpassing them in terms of willpower and action", turned to the "world of imagination", in which young girl characters are "easy to control". Kinsella interprets lolicon as part of a "gaze of both fear and desire" stimulated by the growing power of women in society, and as a reactive desire to see the shōjo "infantilized, undressed, and subordinate". Media scholar Chizuko Naitō views lolicon as reflecting a "societal desire in a broader sense" for young girls as sex symbols in Japan (which she calls a "loliconized society"). Christine Yano argues that eroticized imagery of the shōjo, "real or fictive", reflects "heteronormative pedophilia" in which emphasis is placed on the ephemerality of childhood: "it is as child that [the shōjo] becomes precious as a transitory figure threatened by impending adulthood".

Responding in 1982 to the popularity of Clarisse from his film Lupin III: Castle of Cagliostro, Hayao Miyazaki criticized artists and fans who idolized her in what he considered a demeaning manner, and said that he "hate[d] men who use the word lolicon." Despite his apparent rejection, Saitō and Galbraith still find connections between Miyazaki and desire for young girl characters. Interpreting Miyazaki's own words and his acknowledgment of eroticism as key to his creative process, Galbraith suggests that the distance between Miyazaki and the lolicon boom was about "shame": he criticized men who were open and playful about lolicon desire for having little shame, while he felt embarrassment about his own "longing" for girl characters.

See also

 Hentai – anime and manga pornography
 Junior idol – child or early teenager pursuing a career as a photographic model
 Lolita fashion – Japanese fashion style and subculture
 Shotacon – male equivalent of lolicon, focusing on young boy characters
 Simulated child pornography – produced without direct involvement of children

Notes

References

Citations

Works cited

Further reading

External links
 

 
1970s neologisms
Animation controversies
Anime and manga controversies
Anime and manga genres
Anime and manga terminology
Female stock characters in anime and manga
Hentai
Japanese sex terms
Obscenity controversies in animation
Obscenity controversies in comics
Obscenity controversies in video games
Pedophilia
Wasei-eigo
Girls